Mark Engberink  (born 12 August 1992) is a Dutch footballer who plays as a left back for HSC '21 in the Dutch Derde Divisie.

Club career
He formerly played for FC Twente and Heracles Almelo. In 2015, the player from Lonneker signed a one-year contract with RKC.

Engberink descended in amateur football, when he joined Derde Divisie side HSC '21 in summer 2017.

References

External links
 Profile - Voetbal International
 

1992 births
Living people
Footballers from Enschede
Dutch footballers
Association football fullbacks
FC Twente players
Heracles Almelo players
RKC Waalwijk players
Eredivisie players
Eerste Divisie players
HSC '21 players
Jong FC Twente players